Hugh Bigod may refer to:
Hugh Bigod, 1st Earl of Norfolk (1095–1177), founder of the English family of this name
Hugh le Bigod, Member of Parliament (MP) for Essex
Hugh Bigod (peer), son of Hugh Bigod, 1st Earl of Norfolk by 2nd marriage, see Bigod family
Hugh Bigod, 3rd Earl of Norfolk (1182–1225),
Hugh Bigod (Justiciar) (died 1266), youngest son of Hugh Bigod, 3rd Earl of Norfolk

See also
 Bigod